The enzyme tartrate decarboxylase catalyzes the chemical reaction

(R,R)-tartrate  D-glycerate + CO2

This enzyme belongs to the family of lyases, specifically the carboxy-lyases, which cleave carbon-carbon bonds.  The systematic name of this enzyme class is (R,R)-tartrate carboxy-lyase (D-glycerate-forming). This enzyme is also called (R,R)-tartrate carboxy-lyase.

References

 

EC 4.1.1
Enzymes of unknown structure